The 2000–01 North Carolina Tar Heels men's basketball team represented the University of North Carolina at Chapel Hill during the 2000–01 NCAA Division I men's basketball season. Their head coach was Matt Doherty.  The team captain for this season was Brendan Haywood.  The team played its home games in the Dean Smith Center in Chapel Hill, North Carolina as a member of the Atlantic Coast Conference.

Roster

Fingleton had back surgery in August 2000, but was unable to practice with the team until midway into the season.

Schedule and results

This season was Doherty's first year as head coach, after the retirement of Bill Guthridge.  He was formally announced as head coach on July 11, 2000.

The Tar Heels started the season ranked sixth in the AP Poll.  After suffering back to back losses from Michigan State and an upset loss against an unranked Kentucky, the Tar Heels went on an 18-0 undefeated run, including an undefeated 11-0 run in conference play.  During this run, the Tar Heels were ranked number one in the AP Poll; this Tar Heel team was the first team Doherty coached that reached that achievement.  Despite losses to Clemson, Virginia, and eventual national champions Duke in return fixtures, the Tar Heels won a share of the Atlantic Coast Conference regular season title.

The Tar Heels were the number one seed in the 2001 ACC men's basketball tournament, held that year in Atlanta, Georgia.  They defeated Clemson and Georgia Tech in the semifinals and finals, respectfully, before falling to Duke in the final.

Seeded second in the South Region for the NCAA Tournament, the Tar Heels defeated fifteenth-seeded Princeton in New Orleans, Louisiana before falling to seventh-seeded Penn State in a surprise upset.

The Tar Heels would end the season ranked sixth in the AP Poll and fifth in the Coaches Poll.

On March 30, 2001, Doherty was named the AP Coach of the Year.  He was the first coach to win this honor in his first season coaching a team since Kelvin Sampson in 1995.

|-
!colspan=12 style=| ACC Tournament

|-
!colspan=12 style=| NCAA Tournament

Rankings

*AP does not release post-NCAA Tournament rankings^Coaches did not release a week 2 poll

Team players drafted into the NBA

References 

North Carolina Tar Heels men's basketball seasons
North Carolina
North Carolina
2000 in sports in North Carolina
2001 in sports in North Carolina